Gli amori d'Apollo e di Dafne (The Loves of Apollo and Daphne) is an opera by the Italian composer Francesco Cavalli. It was Cavalli's second operatic work and was premiered at the Teatro San Cassiano, Venice during the Carnival season of 1640. The libretto is by Giovanni Francesco Busenello and is based on the story of the god Apollo's love for the nymph Daphne as told in Ovid's Metamorphoses.

Roles

Recordings
 Gli Amori d'Apollo e di Dafne Orquestra Joven de la Sinfónica de Galicia, Alberto Zedda, Naxos, 2006.
 Gli amori d'Apollo e di Dafne Ensemble Elyma, Gabriel Garrido, K617 2009.
 Gli amori d'Apollo e di Dafne, Act 3: Misero Apollo Philippe Jaroussky, Artaserse.

References

Holden, Amanda (Ed.), The New Penguin Opera Guide, New York: Penguin Putnam, 2001. 
 Libretto of the opera, in Italian.

Italian-language operas
Operas by Francesco Cavalli
1640 operas
Operas based on classical mythology
Operas
Opera world premieres at the Teatro San Cassiano
Operas based on Metamorphoses